La Sierra Norte de Oaxaca is a heavily wooded region in the state of Oaxaca, Mexico. 
It is 62 km from the city of Oaxaca on Federal highway 175, heading east towards Tuxtepec.  
The region is divided into three districts: Ixtlán, which has 26 municipalities, Villa Alta, which has 25 municipalities and Mixe, which has 17 municipalities.

Environment

The western part of the region is mountainous, containing part of the Sierra Madre de Oaxaca which includes the Sierra Juárez and Sierra de Villa Alta.
To the east, the region slopes down to the Veracruz coastal plain.
The area has one of the best-preserved biospheres in Mexico, as well as a number of interesting towns and villages. The region promotes ecotourism to help preserve the biosphere with various enterprises offering cabins, camping, access and guides for hiking and mountain-biking trails, horseback riding, bird-watching, and cave exploration.  It is also one of richest zones of biodiversity in Mexico, with 400 species of birds and 350 species of butterflies. It contains seven of the nine types of vegetation indigenous to the country.

Communities

There are a number of towns located within this area.  Ixtlán is the political and economic center of the region.  Ixtlan is noted for its Church of Saint Thomas the Apostle (Iglesia de Santo Tomás Apostal), which is a baroque-style church known for its portals, façades and sculptures. Capulálpam de Méndez is 9 km east of Ixtlán, and also has a church, Church of Saint Matthew (Iglesia de San Mateo) with altars representative of Mexican Baroque style.  It also has the Centro de Medicina Indígena Tradicional (Center for Indigenous Traditional Medicine) which is sponsored by the Mexican Secretary of Health.  It is open to the public, including tourists and offers native herbal medicines, massages, temascals and ritual cleansings.

Indigenous peoples of the Sierra Norte

Various peoples of the region include the Zapotecs, Mixes, Chinantecs, Tlaxcaltecs and the Nahuas.

The Zapotecs of the Sierra Norte, who call themselves the bene xon, are one of 3 major Zapotec regions in southern Mexico.  The other three reside in the Isthmus of Tehuantepec, el Valle and the Sierra Madre Oriental.  Most Zapotecs are found in the Villa Alta district with some in Ixtlán and a few in Choapan.  The bene xon divide into four sub-cultures: Cajonos, El Rincón, Ixtlán and Choapan.

References

External links
Sierra Norte
Ecoturixtlan

 
Regions of Oaxaca
Sierra Madre de Oaxaca